Telia Lietuva, a member of Telia Company group, is one of the largest telecommunication companies in the Baltic States.

History
Founded in 1991 by Juozas Kazickas as Litcom, Omnitel was Lithuania's first private telecommunications company. In August 2004, Omnitel was acquired by TeliaSonera.

Omnitel was the first network operator in Lithuania to launch GSM services (in 1995) and one of the first companies in Europe having introduced packet data transfer technology GPRS (General Packet Radio Service) in its network. Omnitel was the first in Lithuania to start the commercial 3G services in 2006, which was followed by the highest speed mobile internet HSDPA.

In 2014 Omnitel was the first Network Operator to launch 4G services across Lithuania which became fully covered in 2015

In 2016, Omnitel and Teo began offering new joint services. In 2017, Omnitel was renamed to Telia LT.

In 2018 Telia got Permission to Use 3500Mhz For 5G Trials and Testing

In March 2022, Telia LT started deactivating the 3G network to improve the coverage and quality of the 4G network; by the end of May, one-third of 3G base stations, serving about half of subscribers, were shut down.

In November 2022 Telia LT Shut down 3G in whole country and Reused the 3G band for 4G Capacity Layer to add more speed in whole country together with Band 1 and 28

In 2022 September Telia LT Turned on 5G on 700Mhz (Band 28) as 4G/5G and 3500Mhz (Band 78) only 5G 

In 2023 Summer Telia Covers 99% of Lithuania with Low Band 5G First Operator to do that in Baltics

References 

Telecommunications companies of Lithuania
Telecommunications companies established in 1991
1991 establishments in Lithuania
Companies based in Vilnius
2004 mergers and acquisitions